Third Expedition of Wadi al Qura, also known as the Campaign of Wadi al Qura or Ghazwah of Wadi al Qura took place in June 628 AD, 2nd month of 7AH, of the Islamic calendar.

The operation was successful and the siege lasted 2 days before the Jews surrendered and accepted the terms offered by Islamic prophet Muhammad, similar to what the Jews had done in the Battle of Khaybar and in the Conquest of Fidak.

This was the 3rd Expedition in Wadi al-Qura, the 1st Expedition and 2nd Expedition in Wadi al Qura took place one year earlier.

Siege of Wadi al Qura
After the Battle of Khaybar and Conquest of Fidak, Muhammad made a fresh move towards Wadi Al-Qura, another Jewish colony in Arabia. He mobilized his forces and divided them into three regiments with four banners entrusted to Sa‘d bin ‘Ubada, Al-Hubab bin Mundhir, ‘Abbad bin Bishr and Sahl bin Haneef. Before the fighting, he invited the Jews to embrace Islam, an offer they ignored.

The first of their champions (best fighters) came out and was slain by Zubayr, the second of their champions came out and was slain also, the third was slain by Ali. In this way 11 of the Jews were killed one after another and with each one newly killed, a fresh call was extended inviting those people to profess Islam. Fighting went on ceaselessly and resulted in full surrender of the Jews. The Jews resisted for one or two days, then they surrendered on similar terms like the Jews of Khaybar and Fadak.

After the surrender of the Jews at Wadi al-Qura, Muhammad established his full authority on all the Jewish tribes of Medina.

Primary sources

The event is mentioned in the Sunni hadith collection Al-Muwatta (compiled by Imam Malik, founder of the Maliki school of thought), it states:

See also
 List of expeditions of Muhammad
 Muhammad as a general
 Military career of Muhammad
 Battle of Khaybar
 Muslim–Quraysh War

Notes

627
Campaigns led by Muhammad